The Ch'up'yŏng Line is a non-electrified railway line of the Korean State Railway in Hŭich'ŏn city, Ryanggang Province, North Korea, running from Hŭich'ŏn Ch'ŏngnyŏn Station on the Manp'o Line to industrial suburbs on the opposite side of the Ch'ŏngch'ŏn River.

Route 

A yellow background in the "Distance" box indicates that section of the line is not electrified.

References

Railway lines in North Korea
Standard gauge railways in North Korea